Demetrius I Anicetus ("the unconquered"), also called Damaytra was a Greco-Bactrian and later Indo-Greek king (Yona in Pali language, "Yavana" in Sanskrit) (reigned c. 200–167 BC), who ruled areas from Bactria to ancient northwestern India. He was the son of the Greco-Bactrian Kingdom's ruler Euthydemus I and succeeded him around 200 BC, after which he conquered extensive areas in what is now southern Afghanistan, Iran and Pakistan and India.

He was never defeated in battle and was posthumously referred to as "the Unconquered" (Aniketos) on the pedigree coins of his successor Agathocles. Demetrius I may have been the initiator of the Yavana era, starting in 186–185 BC, which was used for several centuries thereafter.

"Demetrius" was the name of at least two and probably three Bactrian kings. The much debated Demetrius II was a possible relative, whereas Demetrius III, is known only from numismatic evidence.

Encounter with Antiochus III

The father of Demetrius, Euthydemus, was attacked by the Seleucid ruler Antiochus III around 210 BC. Although he commanded 10,000 horsemen, Euthydemus initially lost a battle on the Arius and had to retreat. He then successfully resisted a three-year siege in the fortified city of Bactra, before Antiochus finally decided to recognize the new ruler.

The final negotiations were made between Antiochus III and Demetrius. Antiochus III was reportedly highly impressed by the demeanour of the young prince, and offered him one of his daughters in marriage, around 206 BC:

"And after several journeys of Teleas to and fro between the two, Euthydemus at last sent his son Demetrius to confirm the terms of the treaty. Antiochus received the young prince; and judging from his appearance, conversation, and the dignity of his manners that he was worthy of royal power, he first promised to give him one of his own daughters, and secondly conceded the royal title to his father." Polybius 11.34

The term used for "young prince" is neaniskos (νεανίσκος), suggesting an age around 16, which in turn gives a birth date for Demetrius around 222 BC.

Kuliab inscription
In an inscription found in the Kuliab area of Tadjikistan, in western Greco-Bactria, and dated to 200-195 BC, a Greek by the name of Heliodotos, dedicating a fire altar to Hestia, mentions Euthydemus and Demetrius:

Invasion of India

Demetrius started the invasion of northwestern India in 186 BC, following the destruction of the Mauryan dynasty by the general Pushyamitra Shunga, who then founded the new Indian Shunga dynasty (180–78 BC). Sri Lankan monks state that Brihadratha, the last Mauryan Emperor, married a daughter of Demetrius, Berenice. The Greeks might have invaded the Indus Valley to protect Greek expatriates in the Indian Subcontinent. Also, the Mauryans had had diplomatic alliances with the Greeks, and they may have been considered as allies by the Greco-Bactrians. 

Demetrius may have first started to recover the province of Arachosia, an area south of the Hindu Kush already inhabited by many Greeks but ruled by the Mauryas since the annexation of the territory by Chandragupta from Seleucus. In his Parthian stations, Isidorus of Charax mentions a colony named Demetrias, supposedly founded by Demetrius himself:

"Beyond is Arachosia. And the Parthians call this White India; there are the city of Biyt and the city of Pharsana and the city of Chorochoad and the city of Demetrias; then Alexandropolis, the metropolis of Arachosia; it is Greek, and by it flows the river Arachotus. As far as this place the land is under the rule of the Parthians." "Parthians stations", 1st century BC

A Greek dedication inscribed on stone and discovered in Kuliab, a hundred kilometers northeast of Ai-Khanoum, also mentioned the victories of the prince Demetrius during the reign of his father:
"Heliodotus dedicated this fragrant altar (...) so that the greatest of all kings Euthydemus, as well as his son, the glorious, victorious and remarkable Demetrius, be preserved of all pains, with the help of the Fortune with divine thoughts"

The Greek campaigns may have gone as far as the capital Pataliputra in eastern India (today Patna):
"Those who came after Alexander went to the Ganges and Pataliputra" (Strabo, XV.698)

"The Greeks who caused Bactria to revolt grew so powerful on account of the fertility of the country that they became masters, not only of Ariana, but also of India, as Apollodorus of Artemita says: and more tribes were subdued by them than by Alexander — by Menander in particular (at least if he actually crossed the Hypanis towards the east and advanced as far as the Imaüs), for some were subdued by him personally and others by Demetrius, the son of Euthydemus the king of the Bactrians." (Strabo 11.11.1)

It is generally considered that Demetrius ruled in Taxila (where many of his coins were found in the archaeological site of Sirkap).
The Indian records also describes Greek attacks on Saketa, Panchala, Mathura and Pataliputra (Gargi-Samhita, Yuga Purana chapter). However, the campaigns to Pataliputra are generally attested to the later king Menander I and Demetrius I probably only invaded areas in Pakistan. Other kings may have expanded the territory as well. By c. 175 BC, the Indo-Greeks ruled parts of northwestern India, while the Shungas remained in the Gangetic, Central, and Eastern India.

The Hathigumpha inscription of the Kalinga king Kharavela mentions that fearing him, a Yavana (Greek) king or general retreated to Mathura with his demoralized army. The name of the Yavana king is not clear, but it contains three letters, and the middle letter can be read as ma or mi. Some historians, such as R. D. Banerji and K.P. Jayaswal reconstructed the name of the Yavana king as "Dimita", and identified him with Demetrius. However, several other historians, such as Ramaprasad Chanda, Sailendra Nath Sen and P.L. Gupta disagree with this interpretation.

Aftermath

Demetrius I died of unknown reasons, and the date 180 BC is merely a suggestion aimed to allow suitable regnal periods for subsequent kings, of which there were several. Even if some of them were co-regents, civil wars and temporary divisions of the empire are most likely.

The kings Pantaleon, Antimachus, Agathocles and possibly Euthydemus II ruled after Demetrius I, and theories about their origin include all of them being relatives of Demetrius I, or only Antimachus. Eventually, the kingdom of Bactria fell to the able newcomer Eucratides.

Demetrius II was a later king, possibly a son or nephew of his namesake, and he ruled in India only. Justin mentions him being defeated by the Bactrian king Eucratides, an event which took place at the end of the latter's reign, possibly around 150 BC.
Demetrius II left behind his generals Apollodotus and Menander, who in turn became kings of India and rulers of the Indo-Greek Kingdom following his death.

According to Ptolemy, a Demetriapolis was founded in Arachosia.

Geoffrey Chaucer names Demetrius among the combatants at a tournament held in Athens by Theseus:

Coinage

The coins of Demetrius are of five types. One bilingual type with Greek and Kharoshthi legends exists; it is naturally associated with the Indian Demetrius II. A series with the king in diadem are likely to be early issues of Demetrius I.

There is also one series representing a Gorgon shield on the obverse and a trident on the reverse.

There are also three types depicting elephants. The first type shows Demetrius (I) with elephant-crown, a well-known symbol of India, which simply denotes his conquests in India, as Alexander the Great had also done on his coinage before. One type represents an elephant with Nike on the other side holding a wreath of victory. This sort of symbolism can be seen on the reverse of the coins of Antialcidas in which Nike (supported by Zeus) directly hands the victory wreath to the elephant on the same coin face.

Indian coinage in Gandhara (after 185 BC)

The year 186 BC, with the invasion of the Greco-Bactrians into India, marks an evolution in the design of single-die cast coins in the coinage of Gandhara, as deities and realistic animals were introduced. At the same time coinage technology also evolved, as double-die coins (engraved on both sides, obverse and reverse) started to appear. The archaeological excavations of coins have shown that these coins, as well as the new double die coins, were contemporary with those of the Indo-Greeks. According to Osmund Bopearachchi these coins, and particularly those depicting the goddess Lakshmi, were probably minted by Demetrius I following his invasion of Gandhara.

Buddhism

Buddhism flourished under the Indo-Greek kings, and it has been suggested by W. W. Tarn that their invasion of India was intended to show their support for the Mauryan empire in reaction to the persecution by the Sungas against Buddhism. However, that persecution in turn is debatable, with contemporary historians such as Romila Thapar suggesting that some of the accounts might be the product of exaggeration from Buddhist missionaries. Thapar attributes purely economic motivations to  the Indo-Greek invasion of Southern Asia.

Elephant with the caduceus coinage

One of Demetrius' "elephant" types represents a rejoicing elephant, depicted on the front on the coin and surrounded by the royal bead-and-reel decoration, and therefore treated on the same level as a King. The elephant, one of the symbols of Buddhism and Gautama Buddha, possibly represents the victory of Buddhism brought about by Demetrius. Alternatively, though, the elephant has been described as a possible symbol of the Indian capital of Taxila (Tarn), or as a symbol of India as a whole.

The reverse of the coin depicts the caduceus, symbol of reconciliation between two fighting serpents, which is possibly a representation of peace between the Greeks and the Shungas, and likewise between Buddhism and Hinduism (the caduceus also appears as a symbol of the punch-marked coins of the Maurya Empire in India, in the 3rd-2nd century BC).

Unambiguous Buddhist symbols are found on later Greek coins of Menander I or Menander II, but the conquests of Demetrius I did influence the Buddhist religion in India.

Chronology

See also
 Greco-Bactrian Kingdom
 Seleucid Empire
 Greco-Buddhism
 Indo-Scythians
 Indo-Parthian Kingdom
 Kushan Empire

References

Citations

Bibliography

External links
Coins of Demetrius
More coins of Demetrius
Catalogue of coins of Demetrius

180 BC deaths
Greco-Bactrian kings
Indo-Greek kings
Greek Buddhist monarchs
2nd-century BC rulers in Asia
3rd-century BC rulers in Asia
Year of birth unknown
Euthydemid dynasty